Kolomoki Creek is a stream in the U.S. state of Georgia.  It is a tributary to the Chattahoochee River.

Kolomoki Creek took its name from the Kolomoki Indians. Variant names are "Colomokee Creek", "Koo-loo- moo-kee Creek", and "Kooloomooke Creek".

References

Rivers of Georgia (U.S. state)
Rivers of Clay County, Georgia